Abdul Rahman Ahmed is a Bahraini footballer who played at 2007 AFC Asian Cup.

References

Living people
Bahraini footballers
Bahrain international footballers
Year of birth missing (living people)
Place of birth missing (living people)
Association football goalkeepers
21st-century Bahraini people